Christine Strahalm (born April 10, 1942) is an Austrian sport shooter. She competed at the 1988 Summer Olympics in the women's 25 metre pistol event, in which she tied for 16th place, and the women's 10 metre air pistol event, in which she placed eighth.

References

1942 births
Living people
ISSF pistol shooters
Austrian female sport shooters
Shooters at the 1988 Summer Olympics
Olympic shooters of Austria
20th-century Austrian women